Hunt Spur is a rugged spur descending from Mount Warden along the northwest face of Watson Escarpment in Antarctica. It was mapped by the United States Geological Survey from ground surveys and U.S. Navy air photos, 1960–63, and was named by the Advisory Committee on Antarctic Names for Glenn C. Hunt, an aviation electronics technician of U.S. Navy Squadron VX-6 who participated in Operation Deep Freeze for 5 years.

References

Ridges of Antarctica
Marie Byrd Land